Geno Jones Jr (born July 24, 1992) is a Bahamian sprinter from Grand Bahama who mainly competes in the 100m. He attended Bishop Michael Eldon School before competing for the LSU Tigers track and field and later played American football at Holland College in Canada as a running back.

His personal best of 10.42 seconds was run in Freeport, Bahamas, at the G.B.S.S.A.A Championships, aka "Island Sports", where he won gold. He won double gold in the under 17 100 m and 4x100 m relay at the 2008 Carifta Games in Saint Kitts & Nevis. He also won the under 20 boys 100 m at the 2010 Carifta Games in the Cayman Islands. He competed at the IAAF World U18 Championships and IAAF World U20 Championships without making the final in the 100 m.

Personal bests

References

External links
 World Athletics
 LSU

1992 births
Living people
People from Freeport, Bahamas
People from West Grand Bahama
Bahamian male sprinters
LSU Tigers track and field athletes